Acanthesthes is a genus of longhorn beetles of the subfamily Lamiinae, containing the following species:

 Acanthesthes amycteroides (White, 1858)
 Acanthesthes crispa (Olivier, 1792)

References

Phantasini